Outback Adventures with Tim Faulkner is an educational reality television series airing on ABC on Saturday mornings since October 2014. This series originally aired as part of Litton's Weekend Adventure. It shows the work of Tim Faulkner (born March 8, 1982 in Greystanes, New South Wales) and the team of Australian Reptile Park during their daily jobs.

Reruns of this series aired Saturday mornings on Antenna TV until September 5, 2020. It returned to ABC's Litton's Weekend Adventure on October 3, 2020.

External links 
 

Nature educational television series
2014 American television series debuts
2010s American reality television series
American Broadcasting Company original programming
Australian outback
Litton Entertainment